Wellington Road was a football ground in the Perry Barr area of Birmingham, England. It was the home ground of Aston Villa from 1876 until 1897.

History
Wellington Road was opened in 1876 when Aston Villa moved to the ground. There were initially no spectator facilities, players changed in a nearby blacksmith's shed, and a hayrick was kept on the pitch, which had to be removed prior to matches. However, the ground was gradually improved, with a grandstand built on the eastern touchline and two pavilions built on the western touchline and behind the southern goal line.

The ground's record attendance of 26,849 was set for an FA Cup fifth round match against Preston North End on 7 January 1888. Preston won 3–1, and the match was marred by a huge pitch invasion, the first serious incidence of crowd trouble in English football. Later in 1888 Villa were founder members of the Football League, and the first League match was played at Wellington Road on 15 September 1888, with Villa beating Stoke 5–1 in front of 2,000 spectators.

During the 1890s Wellington Road was used to host two FA Cup semi-finals. In 1889–90 it hosted the Bolton Wanderers–The Wednesday match (1–2), and in 1895–96 hosted the Derby County–Wolverhampton Wanderers game (also 1–2). It was also used as a home venue for the England team, hosting a British Home Championship match on 25 February 1893, with England beating Ireland 6–1.

However, with an uneven pitch and growing crowds, it became increasingly apparent that a new ground was required. Villa moved to Villa Park towards the end of the 1896–97 season, with the last league match played at Wellington Road on 22 March 1897. Villa beat Bolton Wanderers 6–2, with a crowd of 8,000 in attendance.

Part of the site was later used for housing, with the remainder becoming a car park, pub and recreation ground.

References

Defunct football venues in England
Aston Villa F.C.
Defunct sports venues in the West Midlands (county)
Sports venues completed in 1876
1876 establishments in England
English Football League venues